{{DISPLAYTITLE:1β-Methylseleno-N-acetyl-D-galactosamine}}

In organic chemistry, 1β-Methylseleno-N-acetyl--galactosamine is an amino sugar containing selenium. It is found in urine, as a disposal metabolite for selenium.

See also 
List of sugars

References 

Organoselenium compounds
Amino sugars
Selenium(−II) compounds